Hoplosphyrum is a genus of scaly crickets in the family Mogoplistidae. There are about six described species in Hoplosphyrum.

Species
These six species belong to the genus Hoplosphyrum:
 Hoplosphyrum aztecum (Saussure, 1897)
 Hoplosphyrum boreale (Scudder, 1902) (western bush cricket)
 Hoplosphyrum griseum (Philippi, 1863)
 Hoplosphyrum occidentale (Scudder, 1869)
 Hoplosphyrum rufum (Chopard, 1932)
 Hoplosphyrum skottsbergi Chopard, 1923

References

Further reading

 

Crickets
Articles created by Qbugbot